Irina Khitrova (born 29 October 1953) is a Bulgarian former gymnast. She competed at the 1972 Summer Olympics.

References

External links
 

1953 births
Living people
Bulgarian female artistic gymnasts
Olympic gymnasts of Bulgaria
Gymnasts at the 1972 Summer Olympics
Sportspeople from Haskovo Province